Gorreto is a comune (municipality) in the Metropolitan City of Genoa in the Italian region Liguria, located about  northeast of Genoa.

Gorreto borders the following municipalities: Carrega Ligure, Fascia, Ottone, Rovegno.

References

See also
 Parco naturale regionale dell'Antola

Cities and towns in Liguria